Temnostoma trifasciatum (Robertson, 1901), the Three-lined Falsehorn, is a rare species of syrphid fly observed in the eastern and central parts of the United States. Hoverflies can remain nearly motionless in flight. The adults are also known as flower flies for they are commonly found on flowers, from which they get both energy-giving nectar and protein-rich pollen. Temnostoma adults are strong wasp mimics. Larvae burrow in moist decayed wood.

Distribution
Canada, United States

References

Eristalinae
Insects described in 1901
Diptera of North America